Spalgis lemolea, the lemolea harvester or African apefly, is a butterfly in the family Lycaenidae. The species was first described by Hamilton Herbert Druce in 1890. It is found in Senegal, the Gambia, Guinea-Bissau, Guinea, Liberia, Ivory Coast, Ghana, Togo, Nigeria, Cameroon, from Gabon to Ethiopia, the Democratic Republic of the Congo, Uganda, Kenya, Malawi, Zambia, northern Zimbabwe and Botswana. The habitat consists of forests and dense savannah (Guinea savannah and miombo woodland), as well as thick riverine bush.

Adults are attracted to water and fresh as well as dry bird droppings.

The larvae are broad and slug like and are hairy and either black or dark grey. They resemble the coccids upon which they feed. These include Dactylopius (including Dactylopius longispinus, Dactylopius virgatus var. madagascariensis), Pseudococcus, Phenacoccus, Planococcoides, Ferrisiana and Planococcus species.

Subspecies
Spalgis lemolea lemolea (Senegal, the Gambia, Guinea-Bissau, Guinea, Liberia, Ivory Coast, Ghana, Togo, Nigeria, Cameroon, Gabon to Ethiopia, Democratic Republic of the Congo, Uganda, Kenya, Malawi, Zambia, northern Zimbabwe, Botswana)
Spalgis lemolea pilos H. H. Druce, 1890 (Senegal, the Gambia, Guinea-Bissau, Guinea, Liberia, Ivory Coast, Ghana, Togo, Nigeria, Cameroon)

References

Butterflies described in 1890
Miletinae
Butterflies of Africa